Edelweis Rodriguez (July 20, 1911 – February 22, 1962) was an Italian boxer who competed in the 1932 Summer Olympics.

Background 
He was born in Rimini in Northern Italy and was known for his short stature but heavy fists, as well as a fantastic guard.

Performances
Rodriguez placed third in the 1930 European Championships, boxing at the bantamweight class. 

Participating as a flyweight in the 1932 Summer Olympics he was eliminated in the quarter-finals after losing his fight to the upcoming gold medalist István Énekes.

External links

Athlete Profile

1911 births
1962 deaths
Flyweight boxers
Olympic boxers of Italy
Boxers at the 1932 Summer Olympics
Sportspeople from Rimini
Italian male boxers